The Arfak honeyeater (Melipotes gymnops) or bare-eyed honeyeater, is a species of bird in the family Meliphagidae.

References

Melipotes
Birds of the Doberai Peninsula
Birds described in 1873
Taxonomy articles created by Polbot
Taxa named by Philip Sclater